"Million Dollar Baby" is a song by American singer Ava Max, released on September 1, 2022, through Atlantic Records as the second single from her second studio album Diamonds & Dancefloors (2023). The song was written by Max, Jessica Agombar, Michael Pollack, Diane Warren, Casey Smith, and the producers David Stewart, Cirkut and Lostboy. "Million Dollar Baby" is a pop and Eurodance song, with influences by music from the 2000s. It interpolates LeAnn Rimes' 2000 song "Can't Fight the Moonlight", with lyrics about empowerment. An accompanying music video was directed by Andrew Donoho and depicts Max witnessing herself perform at a nightclub.

Background and  composition 
In August 2022, Max announced the title of "Million Dollar Baby" on TikTok and confirmed that an accompanying music video was filmed. She stated that the song was recorded during a difficult time period, with the title and lyrics themed around "self-worth" and overcoming adversity. On August 26, 2022, Max and American singer LeAnn Rimes appeared on several TikTok videos to promote "Million Dollar Baby" by re-enacting a tabletop dance scene from the 2000 musical film Coyote Ugly, and performing the film's soundtrack song "Can't Fight the Moonlight" (2000). The cover art of "Million Dollar Baby" was revealed on Max's Instagram account on August 27, 2022.

"Million Dollar Baby" was released as the second single from Max's second studio album Diamonds & Dancefloors on September 1, 2022. The song was written by Max, Jessica Agombar, Michael Pollack, Diane Warren, Casey Smith, and the producers David Stewart, Cirkut and Lostboy.

Musically, "Million Dollar Baby" is a pop and Eurodance song, inspired by music from the 2000s. It interpolates "Can't Fight the Moonlight" by LeAnn Rimes, which serves as the Coyote Ugly theme song. The song name-drops the 2004 film of the same name, while Lindsay Zoladz of The New York Times noticed similarities with Lady Gaga's 2009 song "Bad Romance" in the bridge. The lyrics are based on the theme of empowerment, which begins with grief and ends in emancipation.

Reception 
KIIS-FM writer Rebekah Gonzalez described "Million Dollar Baby" as "dancefloor-ready" and considered it to be a "song of the summer", while Shaad D'Souza of Paper thought the song sounded "euphoric". Writing for Los Angeles, Abigail Siatkowski opined that Max was inspired by Lady Gaga and developed "Million Dollar Baby" with her own "pop flare". Zoladz complimented the song's "sleek [and] calisthenic" production, but believed Max was a pop "practitioner" without a "distinct persona". Jenesaispop writer Jordi Bardají criticized "Million Dollar Baby" for containing a similar melody to "Can't Fight the Moonlight" and over-relying on interpolations, but stated that it is not "a bad song at all".

Promotion 
An accompanying music video for "Million Dollar Baby" was first teased by Max on her social media accounts. The video was directed by Andrew Donoho, which was released alongside the song. Max sports brunette hair as she enters a nightclub named Diamonds & Dancefloors, which references her second studio album title. She witnesses a blonde version of herself perform onstage with a group of backup dancers. Both versions eventually combine into a single dark-haired entity with a glittering dress after the former follows the latter backstage, where Max then performs onstage and vanishes. Gonzalez considered the music video to be "stunning", while Uproxx staff writer Adrian Spinelli wrote that it was "opulent".

Max performed "Million Dollar Baby" atop a large diamond stage at the 2022 MTV Europe Music Awards on November 13, 2022. The song is included on the 2022 rhythm game Just Dance 2023 Edition, with the choreography performed by Max herself as the coach.

Credits and personnel 
Credits adapted from Tidal.

 Amanda Ava Koci vocals, songwriting
 Henry Walter songwriting, production, programming
 David Stewart songwriting, production, programming
 Lostboy songwriting, production
 Jessica Agombar songwriting
 Michael Pollack songwriting
 Diane Warren songwriting
 Casey Smith songwriting
 Tom Norris mixer
 Chris Gehringer mastering

Charts

Weekly charts

Monthly charts

Year-end charts

Release history

References

2022 singles
2022 songs
Ava Max songs
Atlantic Records singles
Song recordings produced by Cirkut (record producer)
Songs with feminist themes
Songs written by Ava Max
Songs written by Cirkut (record producer)
Songs written by Diane Warren
Eurodance songs
Songs written by Michael Pollack (musician)